Mami Kawada Best Birth (styled as MAMI KAWADA BEST ~BIRTH~) is a compilation album by J-pop singer Mami Kawada. It was released on February 13, 2013 under Geneon Universal Entertainment. This album tentatively contains sixteen tracks which include her singles "Masterpiece" and her newly released song "Borderland". This BEST album does not feature the opening theme for the OVA series Shakugan no Shana S entitled "Prophecy".

The album came in a limited Blu-ray edition (GNCV-1032) and a regular CD-only edition (GNCV-1033). The Blu-ray edition contains footage from Kawada’s 2012 Live Tour ~ Square the Circle ~ captured at Ebisu Liquid Room on September 17, 2012.

Track listing
Radiance - 4:21
Lyrics by: Mami Kawada & Kotoko
Composition & Arrangement by: Tomoyuki Nakazawa
Performed by: Mami Kawada
Hishoku no Sora - 4:15
Lyrics: Mami Kawada
Composition/Arrangement by: Tomoyuki Nakazawa
Performed by: Mami Kawada
Akai Namida - 4:19
Lyrics: Mami Kawada
Composition: Tomoyuki Nakazawa
Arrangement: Tomoyuki Nakazawa
Performed by: Mami Kawada
Get My Way! - 2:56
Composition: Kazuya Takase
Arrangement by: Kazuya Takase, Takeshi Ozaki
Performed by: Mami Kawada
Lyrics: Mami Kawada
Joint - 4:01
Lyrics: Mami Kawada
Composition: Tomoyuki Nakazawa
Arrangement: Tomoyuki Nakazawa, Takeshi Ozaki
Performed by: Mami Kawada
PSI-Missing - 4:23
Lyrics: Mami Kawada
Composition: Tomoyuki Nakazawa
Arrangement by: Takeshi Ozaki
Performed by: Mami Kawada
Masterpiece - 4:37
Lyrics: Mami Kawada
Composition/Arrangement: Maiko Iuchi
Performed by: Mami Kawada
No Buts! - 3:37
Lyrics: Mami Kawada
Composition: Tomoyuki Nakazawa
Arrangement: Tomoyuki Nakazawa, Takeshi Ozaki
Performed by: Mami Kawad
See visionS - 5:26
Lyrics: Mami Kawada
Composition/Arrangement: Maiko Iuchi
Performed by: Mami Kawada
Serment - 4:17
Lyrics: Mami Kawada
Composition: Tomoyuki Nakazawa
Arrangement: Tomoyuki Nakazawa, Takeshi Ozaki 
Performed by: Mami Kawada
Borderland - 3:43
Lyrics: Mami Kawada
Composition: Tomoyuki Nakazawa
Arrangement: Tomoyuki Nakazawa, Takeshi Ozaki and Kazuya Takase
Performed by: Mami Kawada
Fixed Star 
Lyrics: Mami Kawada
Composition: Tomoyuki Nakazawa
Arrangement: Tomoyuki Nakazawa, Takeshi Ozaki
Performed by: Mami Kawada
Kaze to Kimi o Daite (2013 ver.) 
Lyrics: TBA
Composition: TBA
Arrangement: TBA
Performed by: Mami Kawada
Eclipse 
Lyrics: TBA
Composition: TBA
Arrangement: TBA
Performed by: Mami Kawada
Asu e no Namida
Lyrics: TBA
Composition: TBA
Arrangement: TBA
Performed by: Mami Kawada
Birth
Lyrics: TBA
Composition: TBA
Arrangement: TBA
Performed by: Mami Kawada

2013 compilation albums
Mami Kawada albums